Gualtieri is  comune (municipality) in the Province of Reggio Emilia, Italy.

Gualtieri may also refer to:

People
 Davide Gualtieri (born 1971), Sammarinese former footballer
 Giovanni dei Gualtieri (1565–1619), Roman Catholic prelate, Bishop of Sansepolcro
 Gualtieri di San Lazzaro (1904–74), Italian author and art publisher
 Kaely Michels-Gualtieri, American trapeze artist
 Niccolò Gualtieri (1688–1744), Italian doctor and malacologist
 Paolo Rocco Gualtieri (born 1961), Italian prelate of the Catholic Church
 Robert A. "Bob" Gualtieri (born 1961), American law enforcement officer, lawyer and politician
 Roberto Gualtieri (born 1966), Italian socialist politician
 Ulisse Gualtieri (born 1941), Italian former footballer

Other
 Gualtieri Sicaminò, comune (municipality) in the Metropolitan City of Messina in the Italian region Sicily
 Paulie Gualtieri, fictional character played by Tony Sirico on the HBO series The Sopranos

Italian-language surnames
Patronymic surnames
Surnames from given names